Monilinia is a genus of fungi in the family Sclerotiniaceae.

Monilinia fungi are pathogens to Rosaceae and Ericaceae and often cause major losses to crops. The genus is sometimes divided into two sections based on whether they possess disjunctors - these are small structures in mature fungi that help with spore dispersal. There are about thirty known species in this genus. Most studies of the fungi focus on their pathogenic effects toward apples, pears and other fruits. The diseases they cause include brown rot and dry berry disease.

In Japan, some species have pharmacological uses.

References

External links
Index Fungorum

Sclerotiniaceae
Leotiomycetes genera